Zerba is a comune (municipality) in the Province of Piacenza in the Italian region Emilia-Romagna, located about  west of Bologna and about  southwest of Piacenza.

Zerba borders the following municipalities: Brallo di Pregola, Cabella Ligure, Cerignale, Fabbrica Curone, Ottone, Santa Margherita di Staffora.

Demographic evolution

References

Cities and towns in Emilia-Romagna